Lake Seymour is a lake in Martin County, Minnesota.

Lake Seymour was named for W. S. Seymour, an early settler.

See also
List of lakes in Minnesota

References

Lakes of Minnesota
Lakes of Martin County, Minnesota